Jesuit Church, otherwise the Church of the Holy Trinity (Biserica Sfânta Treime), is a Roman Catholic church located at 3 Piața Mare, Sibiu, Romania. Immediately adjacent to Brukenthal Palace, it is one of the most notable baroque churches in Transylvania.

The church is listed as a historic monument by Romania's Ministry of Culture and Religious Affairs.

Carmen Iohannis, the wife of president Klaus Iohannis, sings in the choir of this church.

See also
 Eyes of Sibiu
 Gheorghe Lazăr National College, the former Jesuit Gymnasium of Sibiu
 Sibiu Lutheran Cathedral
 Council Tower of Sibiu
 List of Jesuit sites

References

Religious buildings and structures in Sibiu
18th-century Roman Catholic church buildings in Romania
Baroque church buildings in Romania
Jesuit churches in Romania
Roman Catholic churches completed in 1733
Historic monuments in Sibiu County